Meteorin, glial cell differentiation regulator is a protein that in humans is encoded by the METRN gene.

Function

Meteorin regulates glial cell differentiation and promotes the formation of axonal networks during neurogenesis. Aligned with its neurotrophic properties Meteorin promotes neurotic outgrowth of cultured dorsal root ganglion sensory neurons via a mechanism that involves satellite glial cells. Meteorin also has been shown to have profound and extremely long-lasting analgesic effects in animal models of inflammatory and neuropathic pain.

The human variant of the protein is currently being developed by the Danish biotechnology company, Hoba Therapeutics, for the treatment of neuropathic pain in humans.

References

Further reading